Amit Sana (born 1 March 1983) is an Indian pop artist, playback singer, live performer and the finalist of Indian Idol 1. He was also a part of the show Jo Jeeta Wohi Superstar. He sings predominantly in Hindi. Apart from this, he has also sung in Telugu, Punjabi, Bengali, Assamese language films.

Personal life

Amit Sana was born on 1 March 1983 to Shyamsundar Rao Sana and Rajeshwari Sana in Bhilai, Madhya Pradesh (now Chhattisgarh). He started singing at the age of 3 and by the time he was 8 years old he started begin with his classical training. His father spotted his talent of singing when he performed for Bhilai steel plant and later sent him to Late Shri R.R.Ghule for his initial classical training. He trained him till the age of 16. He later went for learning professional classical singing from his guru Late Shri Bimalendu Mukherjee (vice chancellor, Indira Kala Sangeet Vishwavidyalaya Khairagarh) for 3 years. He was married to Miss Manisha Bansal in the year 2011 and got divorced in the year 2018.

Career

He started his career in singing at the age of 8 years when he performed for Bhilai Steel Plant for the first time on stage. Later he started participating in all the Local and State Level Music Competitions and soon became famous in the Local Music fraternity. He also performed at All India Kiran Sangeet Samaroh, Katni where he stood third. He also represented his state Chhattisgarh in the National Youth Festival in the Indian Classical genre. After finishing his school, he moved to Jamshedpur (Jharkhand) for his bachelor's degree in Information Technology from where he auditioned for Pop Stars for Channel V in 2002 along with his brother but was not selected. He later on gave audition for Indian Idol 1 from Kolkata in the year 2004 where he was selected and later on became the finalist of the show Indian Idol Season 1. His most relevant performances during the show were ″ZINDAGI MEIN KOI KABHI AAYE NA RABBA, BIJURIA, YAARON DOSTI, WOH KISNA HAI AND MOHABATTEIN LUTAUNGA″.

Post Indian Idol he released his first album ″CHALDIYE″ composed by VISHAL - SHEKHAR with Sony Music in 2005. Later on he released his 2nd album "YAADEIN" composed by "RAJIV BHATT" through Times Music in the year 2008. He then participated in another reality show Jo Jeeta Wohi Super Star on Star Plus in 2008 as a celebrity singer and was eliminated after a few performances.

Reality show

Discography

Movies

Music video and albums

References

External links
 

1983 births
Living people
Indian male singers